Huawei Premia 4G M931 is an Android smartphone offered by MetroPCS. Huawei Premia 4G M931 features Android 4.0

Overview

Huawei Premia 4G M931 Metro comes as an  innovated smart-phone introduced by MtroPCS to add to its  line-up of cheap 4G LTE handsets. Priced at $149.99, the M931 runs Ice Cream Sandwich. The smart-Phone Huawei Premia 4G M931 phone is featured with a 4inch display with 800 x 480 pixels and Corning Gorilla Glass. Other highlights include: Wi-Fi, DLNA, GPS, Bluetooth, Rhapsody Music Unlimited, 1.3MP front-facing camera, 5MP rear camera with LED flash and 720p video recording, dual-core 1.5GHz Processor, 1GB of RAM, and MicroSD card support.

See also
List of Android devices
Smartphone

References

Android (operating system) devices
Huawei mobile phones
Mobile phones introduced in 2013